The Jackson metropolitan area may refer to:

The Jackson metropolitan area, Mississippi, United States
The Jackson metropolitan area, Tennessee, United States
The Jackson, Michigan metropolitan area, United States
The Jackson, Ohio micropolitan area, United States
The Jackson, Wyoming micropolitan area, United States

See also
Jackson (disambiguation)